Janet Mary Grieve , also known as Janet Bradford-Grieve and Janet Bradford, is a New Zealand biological oceanographer, born in 1940. She is researcher emerita at the National Institute of Water and Atmospheric Research in Wellington. She has researched extensively on marine taxonomy and biological productivity.  She was president of both the New Zealand Association of Scientists (1998–2000) and the World Association of Copepodologists (2008–11).

Education and early career 
Her PhD, supervised by George Knox at the University of Canterbury, developed new observations in copepod taxonomy but also produced insights into the processes affecting zooplankton in Kaikoura submarine canyon. Her pioneering research in this canyon provides a baseline for the biological and physical changes associated with the 2016 Kaikoura earthquake.

Immediately after her PhD she joined the New Zealand Oceanographic Institute, a section within the New Zealand Department of Scientific and Industrial Research  as a scientist. She broke this with a period as a visiting scholar at the Smithsonian Institution, copepod taxonomy for a time (1970–73).

She participated in the Ross Ice Shelf Project expedition to the central Ross Ice Shelf. The team successfully bored through the ice shelf in 1977 to retrieve data and samples in the ice shelf cavity.

She continued with the New Zealand Oceanographic Institute and remained when it was absorbed into National Institute of Water and Atmospheric Research.

Science and impact 
Publishing under surnames Grieve, Bradford and Bradford-Grieve, she has made a significant contribution to the fields of biological oceanography in New Zealand and internationally. She is responsible for some of the very first measurements of open ocean productivity in New Zealand waters. Her research has extended from the subtropics to the Antarctic/Southern Ocean.  She has researched topics such as ocean food webs and ecology, and is regarded as the global expert on copepod biosystematics.

Grieve was a key researcher involved in the environmental survey work that underpinned and guided the development of the Maui oil and gas production facilities within the Taranaki Bight. This was one of the first marine developments to consider detailed environmental management. In addition she was also on the Task Force group responsible for reviewing the NZ Fisheries Legislation in 1991–92.

Science leadership 
She was Manager of the Marine and Freshwater Division of the NZOI, DSIR (1989–91). She was President of the New Zealand Association of Scientists (1998–2000). In addition she was President of the World Association of Copepodologists (2008–11).

Honours and awards 
In 1990, Grieve was awarded the New Zealand 1990 Commemoration Medal. In the 2007 Queen's Birthday Honours, she was appointed an Officer of the New Zealand Order of Merit, for services to marine science. In 1995, she received the New Zealand Marine Sciences Society Award (1995).

In 2017, Grieve was selected as one of the Royal Society Te Apārangi's "150 women in 150 words", celebrating the contributions of women to knowledge in New Zealand.

Publications
 Systematics and ecology of New Zealand central east coast plankton sampled at Kaikoura, 1972
 New parasitic Choniostomatidae (Copepoda) mainly from Antarctic and Subantarctic Ostracoda, 1975
 The marine fauna of New Zealand : pelagic calanoid copepods : families Euchaetidae, Phaennidae, Scolecithricidae, Diaixidae, and Tharybidae, 1980
 New Zealand region primary productivity, surface, 1980
 New Zealand region, zooplankton biomass 0-200m., 1980
 The marine fauna of New Zealand. Megacalanidae, Calanidae, Paracalanidae, Mecynoceridae, Eucalanidae, Spinocalanidae, Clausocalanidae , 1994
 The marine fauna of New Zealand : Pelagic Copepoda : Poecilostomatoida:Oncaeidae, 1995
 The marine fauna of New Zealand. Bathypontiidae, Arietellidae, Augaptilidae, Heterorhabdidae, Lucicutiidae, Metridinidae, Phyllopodidae, Centropagidae, Pseudodiaptomidae, Temoridae, Candaciidae, Pontellidae, Sulcanidae, Acartiidae, Tortanidae, 1999

References 

New Zealand marine biologists
Women oceanographers
Date of birth missing (living people)
Living people
University of Canterbury alumni
Officers of the New Zealand Order of Merit
People associated with Department of Scientific and Industrial Research (New Zealand)
1940 births